is a real-time strategy role-playing video game developed by Taito for the Nintendo DS system. It supports the Nintendo Wi-Fi Connection.

Gameplay
There are two primary elements to this game: the magic system, and the use of captured monsters as soldiers. Since mages, such as the one the player controls, cannot physically attack, the player must rely on magic. The player can launch a wide variety of magical spells by drawing runes on the DS's touch screen. Runes drawn more accurately result in more powerful spells. However, some runes are easier to draw than others, and drawing runes slowly may leave the player open to attacks. There are 18 different runes. The elements of magic that the player can use in LostMagic are as follows: fire, water, earth, light, dark, and wind. Not too far into the game the player will be able to fuse runes, with one example being fusing Fire 2 (explosion) and water 1 (ice shot) to make an explosion of ice. However, the combination of Ice 1 followed by Fire 2 is a completely different spell. Around the end of the game the player can fuse 3 runes together, creating 5832 new combination possibilities; however, most of these fail to work. In all there are 396 different spells. When used in combination, typically the first rune determines the effect of the spell, and the other(s) determine its elemental type. For example, any Duo Rune (a Combo of two runes) starting with Fire 2 will be an explosion of some type. The variety of spells in LostMagic leads to a greater depth of gameplay.

Most enemies can be captured with certain spells, and then brought out to fight for the player in later battles. There are a total of 62 monsters that the player can collect. Player-controlled monsters fight with the same artificial intelligence as computer-controlled enemies. The player can give movement commands by selecting one or a group of monsters with the stylus, but more specific controls are not possible. Ultimately, the monsters control themselves, since if they get too close to a monster they will automatically run towards it and attack. The monsters can be leveled up to a maximum of level 50. Their stats slowly increase as they level up. In addition, their stats can be further boosted by "buff-up" spells, as well as items.

In addition to the stat-boosting spells, there are a set of items the player can equip them with. The items work by boosting a stat by a percentage, rather than a fixed value. The player can also collect higher-level versions of the items he already has. Lower-level items tend to be found at the beginning of the game while higher-level items tend to be found near the end of the game and are rarer than other items.

Multiplayer
Using multiplayer, players can fight against a friend or foe a short distance away. The battle options include "Free Duel" using preset character settings, and "Duel" using the saved character data. Actual duels will be saved, and are a fun way for players to gain experience points while learning new spells from others.

In Nintendo Wi-Fi Connection, the player has the opportunity to fight using a preset character of Lvl 40, or their character and monsters from the Story Mode. Using the Story Mode, the character yields experience to level up your party for Story Mode. Many reviews complain of lag in the online modes. The WiFi battles consist of epic duels between two mages and each of the monsters that are selected before the match begins.

Online gaming groups, sometimes known as clans, were popular in the Wi-Fi mode of LostMagic during its early months. Most gamers belonging in a clan could be recognized by an underscore and the initials of a clan after their name. However, because of a drop in LostMagic's popularity, most clans for the game died off and are no longer existent.

With single-card play, in which case only 1 person needs to own the game, the second player can only download a demo of the game. With multi-card Play, players take their Story Mode teams and fight each other for experience to level up. People fought in local multi-card play are automatically added to each other's Wi-Fi Friend lists.

Plot

The game's storyline centers on a young mage named Isaac, whose father Russell has left him in the possession of the Wand of Light, one of seven powerful wands which allows him to cast damaging, healing, and other spells, and also capture and control opposing monsters. Isaac got separated from his parents when he was little, and was raised by a forest witch in the arts of magic.

Reception

Japanese magazine Famitsu gave LostMagic an overall score of 30/40 (individual reviews: 9/7/8/6). The game got a score of 70.19% from GameRankings and 68 out of 100 from Metacritic.

Sequels
A spiritual successor, also developed by Taito but published by Nintendo, was released for the Wii in Japan on May 21, 2009. A sequel titled  was made by Taito for mobile phones.

References

External links 
 
  

2006 video games
Fantasy video games
Multiplayer and single-player video games
Multiplayer online games
Nintendo DS-only games
Nintendo DS games
Nintendo Wi-Fi Connection games
Real-time strategy video games
Role-playing video games
Taito games
Ubisoft games
Video games developed in Japan